Benjamin Kristoffersen Lee (born 15 April 1989) is a Danish professional footballer who plays in Singapore for Young Lions, as a striker.

Career
Lee has played in Denmark and Singapore for AB, B93, VIF, Frem and Young Lions.

Personal life
Lee's father was born in Singapore and later gained Danish nationality.

References

1989 births
Living people
Danish men's footballers
Expatriate footballers in Singapore
Akademisk Boldklub players
Singapore Premier League players
Young Lions FC players
Association football forwards